The 2014–15 season is the 83rd season in Málaga CF history and its 34th in the top-tier.

Squad statistics

Appearances and goals
Updated as of 30 May 2015.

|-
! colspan=14 style=background:#dcdcdc; text-align:center| Players who have made an appearance or had a squad number this season but have been loaned out or transferred

|}

Competitions

Overall

La Liga

League table

Results by round

Matches
Kickoff times are in CET.

Copa del Rey

Round of 32

Round of 16

Quarter-finals

References

Málaga CF seasons
Malaga CF